Sergei Muhhin (born 21 January 1990 in Tallinn) is an Estonian former competitive figure skater. As a single skater, he is the 2006 Estonian national champion. He switched to pair skating in 2009 and teamed up with Natalya Zabiyako. They are the 2010 Estonian champions.

He is the younger brother of Jelena Muhhina, who also competed in figure skating.

Programs

With Zabiyako

Single skating

Competitive highlights
JGP: Junior Grand Prix

Pair skating with Zabiyako

Single skating

References

External links 
 
 

Estonian male single skaters
Estonian male pair skaters
Living people
1990 births
Figure skaters from Tallinn
Estonian people of Russian descent